Crockett County is the name of two counties in the United States, both named for frontiersman and politician Davy Crockett:

 Crockett County, Tennessee 
 Crockett County, Texas